Gemophos viverratoides is a species of sea snail, a marine gastropod mollusk in the family Pisaniidae.

Description

Distribution
This species is distributed in European waters.

References

 Orbigny A. D. d' (1839–1842). Mollusques, Echinodermes, Foraminifères et Polypiers recueillis aux Iles Canaries par MM. Webb et Berthelot et décrits par Alcide d'Orbigny. Mollusques. Béthune, Paris : 117 p
 Gofas, S.; Le Renard, J.; Bouchet, P. (2001). Mollusca, in: Costello, M.J. et al. (Ed.) (2001). European register of marine species: a check-list of the marine species in Europe and a bibliography of guides to their identification. Collection Patrimoines Naturels, 50: pp. 180–213

External links

Pisaniidae
Gastropods described in 1840